The Oberwolfach Research Institute for Mathematics is a center for mathematical research in Oberwolfach, Germany. It was founded by mathematician Wilhelm Süss in 1944.

It organizes weekly workshops on diverse topics where mathematicians and scientists from all over the world come to do collaborative research.

The Institute is a member of the Leibniz Association, funded mainly by the  German Federal Ministry of Education and Research and by the state of Baden-Württemberg. It also receives substantial funding from the Friends of Oberwolfach foundation, from the Oberwolfach Foundation and from numerous donors.

History

The Oberwolfach Research Institute for Mathematics (MFO) was founded as the Reich Institute of Mathematics (German: Reichsinstitut für Mathematik) on 1 September 1944. It was one of several research institutes founded by the Nazis in order to further the German war effort, which at that time was clearly failing. The location was selected to be remote as not to be a target for ally bombing. Originally it was housed in a building called the Lorenzenhof, a large Black Forest hunting lodge. After the war, Süss, a member of the Nazi party, was suspended for two months in 1945 as part of the county's denazification efforts, but thereafter remained head of the institute. Though the institute lost its government funding, Süss was able to keep it going with other grants, and contributed to rebuilding mathematics in Germany following the fall of the Third Reich by hosting international mathematical conferences. Some of these were organised by Reinhold Baer, a mathematician who was expelled from University of Halle in 1933 for being Jewish, but later returned to Germany in 1956 at the University of Frankfurt. The institute regained government funding in the 1950s. 

After Süss's death in 1958, Hellmuth Kneser was briefly director before Theodor Schneider permanently took over in the role in 1959. In that year, he and others formed the mathematical society Gesellschaft für Mathematische Forschung e. V. in order to run the MFO. 

1967: 10 October : Inauguration of the guest house of the MFO, a gift of the Volkswagen Foundation

1975: 13 June : Inauguration of the library and meetings building of the MFO, which replaced the old castle, also a gift of the Volkswagen Foundation

1989: 26 May : Inauguration of the extension of the guest building

1995: Establishment of the research programme "Research in Pairs"

2005: 1 January : The MFO becomes a member of the Leibniz Association

2007: Establishment of the post-doctoral programme "Oberwolfach Leibniz Fellows"

2007: 5 May : Inauguration of the library extension, a gift of the Klaus Tschira Stiftung and the Volkswagen Foundation

2005 – 2010: General restoration of the guest house and the library building

Statue

The iconic model of the Boy surface was installed in front of the Institute, as a gift from Mercedes-Benz on 28 January 1991.

The Boy Surface is named after Werner Boy who constructed the surface in his 1901 thesis, written under the direction of David Hilbert.

Directors 
 1944–1958, Wilhelm Süss
 1958–1959, Hellmuth Kneser
 1959–1963, Theodor Schneider
 1963–1994, Martin Barner
 1994–2002, Matthias Kreck
 2002–2013, 
 2013–present Gerhard Huisken

Oberwolfach Prize 
The Oberwolfach Prize is awarded approximately every three years for excellent achievements in changing fields of mathematics to young mathematicians not older than 35 years. It is financed by the Oberwolfach Foundation and awarded in cooperation with the institute.

Prize winners
	
 1991 Peter Kronheimer
 1993  and Jens Franke
 1996  and 
 1998 Alice Guionnet
 2000 Luca Trevisan
 2003 Paul Biran
 2007 Ngô Bảo Châu
 2010  and 
 2013 Hugo Duminil-Copin
 2016 Jacob Fox
 2019 Oscar Randal-Williams

References

External links 

 Home page of the institute
 Web page about the Oberwolfach Prize

Leibniz Association
Research institutes in Germany
International research institutes for mathematics
Organisations based in Baden-Württemberg
Research institutes established in 1944
Mathematics in Germany